Olena Rurak (born 7 February 1972) is a Ukrainian sprinter. She competed in the 400 metres at the 1996 Summer Olympics and the 2000 Summer Olympics.

See also
 List of Maccabiah records in athletics

References

1972 births
Living people
Athletes (track and field) at the 1996 Summer Olympics
Athletes (track and field) at the 2000 Summer Olympics
Ukrainian female sprinters
Olympic athletes of Ukraine
Place of birth missing (living people)
Universiade bronze medalists for Ukraine
Universiade medalists in athletics (track and field)
Medalists at the 1995 Summer Universiade
Olympic female sprinters